Ptychobarbus conirostris (common name: Indus snowtrout) is a species of cyprinid of the genus Ptychobarbus. It inhabits India, Pakistan and Tibet in mountain streams and rivers. It is considered harmless to humans.

References

Cyprinid fish of Asia
Freshwater fish of China
Freshwater fish of India
Fish of Pakistan